was a Japanese film director and screenwriter who directed over 60 films during his career spanning 50 years.

Career
Born in Kyoto, Toyoda moved to Tokyo after finishing high school and studied scriptwriting under the pioneering film director Eizō Tanaka. He joined the Kamata section of the Shōchiku film studios and worked as an assistant director under Yasujirō Shimazu, before giving his directorial debut in 1929. After his move to the independent Tokyo Hassei Eiga Shisaku studio (later Toho), he directed the successful Young People (1937) and gained a reputation for directing literary adaptations with a humanistic touch, in particular Uguisu (1938) and Spring on Leper's Island (1940). After World War II, he achieved fame for his adaptations of writers like Yasunari Kawabata, Kafū Nagai, Naoya Shiga, Jun'ichirō Tanizaki, Masuji Ibuse, and Ango Sakaguchi, distinguished by their visual imagination and superb acting. Noted works of this era include The Wild Geese (1953), Marital Relations (1955), A Cat, Shozo, and Two Women (1956) and Snow Country (1957). Toyoda died in Tokyo in 1977.

Filmography

Director 

 1929: Irodorareru kuchibiru (彩られる唇)
 1929: Tokai o oyogu onna (都会を泳ぐ女)
 1930: Yūai kekkon (友愛結婚)
 1930: Kokoro ogoreru onna (心驕れる女)
 1931: 愛よ人類と共にあれ　前篇　日本篇
 1934: 隣の八重ちゃん
 1934: 私の兄さん
 1935: 三人の女性
 1935: 春琴抄　お琴と佐助
 1936: 東京−大阪特ダネ往来
 1936: 大番頭小番頭
 1936: 蒲田　大船スタジオの春
 1937: 港は浮気風
 1937: オヤケアカハチ
 1937: Young People (若い人, Wakai hito)
 1937: 十字砲火
 1938: Nakimushi kozo (泣蟲小僧)
 1938: Fuyu no yado (冬の宿)
 1938: Uguisu (鶯)
 1940: 奥村五百子
 1940: Spring on Leper's Island (小島の春, Kojima no haru)
 1940: Ōhinata-mura (大日向村)
 1941: わが愛の記 1
 1943: Wakaki sugata (若き姿)
 1946: 檜舞台
 1947: Four Love Stories (四つの恋の物語　第一話　初恋, Yottsu no koi no monogatari)
 1948: わが愛は山の彼方に
 1949: 白鳥は悲しからずや
 1950: Onna no shiki (女の四季)
 1951: Eriko to tomo-ni dai-ichi bu (えりことともに　第一部)
 1951: Eriko to tomo-ni dai-ni bu (えりことともに　第二部)
 1951: Sekirei no kyoku (せきれいの曲)
 1952: 風ふたゝび
 1952: Haru no sasayaki (春の囁き)
 1953: The Wild Geese (雁, Gan)
 1954: Aru onna (或る女)
 1955: The Grass Whistle a.k.a. Love Never Fails  (麦笛, Mugibue)
 1955: Marital Relations (夫婦善哉, Meoto zenzai)
 1956: The Legend of the White Serpent (白夫人の妖恋, Byaku fujin no yoren)
 1956: A Cat, Shozo, and Two Women (猫と庄造と二人のをんな, Neko to Shozo to futari no onna)
 1957: Snow Country (雪国, Yukiguni)
 1957: Yuunagi (夕凪)
 1958: Makeraremasen katsumadewa (負ケラレセン勝マデハ)
 1958: The Inn in Front of the Train Station (喜劇　駅前旅館, Kigeki ekimae ryokan)
 1959: Hana noren (花のれん)
 1959: 男性飼育法
 1959: An'ya kōro (暗夜行路)
 1960: Chinpindō shujin (珍品堂主人)
 1960: The Twilight Story (〓東綺譚, Bokuto kidan)
 1961: The Diplomat's Mansion (東京夜話, Tokyo yawa)
 1962: Till Tomorrow Comes (明日ある限り, Ashita aru kagiri)
 1962: Ika naru hoshi no moto ni (如何なる星の下に)
 1963: Madame Aki (憂愁平野, Yushu heiya)
 1963: The Maid Story (台所太平記, Daidokoro taiheiki)
 1963: Shin meoto zenzai (新・夫婦善哉)
 1964: Kigeki yōki-na mibōjin (喜劇 陽気な未亡人)
 1964: Sweet Sweat (甘い汗, Amai ase)
 1965: Nami kage (波影)
 1965: Illusion of Blood (四谷怪談, Yotsuya kaidan)
 1965:'Tale of a Carpenter (大工太平記, Daiku taiheki)
 1967: River of Forever (千曲川絶唱, Chikumagawa zesshō)
 1967: Kigeki ekimae hyakku-nen (喜劇　駅前百年)
 1968: Kigeki ekimae kaiun (喜劇　駅前開運)
 1969: Portrait of Hell (地獄変, Jigoku-hen)
 1969: 地獄変
 1973: The Twilight Years (恍惚の人, Kōkotsu no hito)
 1976: 妻と女の間

Screenwriter

 1925: 夕の鐘
 1925: 愛妻の秘密
 1926: 覆面の影
 1926: 万公
 1927: 恋を拾った男
 1927: 弱き人々
 1927: 深夜のお客
 1929: Irodorareru kuchibiru (彩られる唇)
 1929: Tokai o oyogu onna (都会を泳ぐ女)
 1930: 友愛結婚
 1936: 東京−大阪特ダネ往来
 1936: Yūai kekkon (一本刀土俵入)
 1952: Haru no sasayaki (春の囁き)
 1955: The Grass Whistle a.k.a. Love Never Fails (麦笛, Mugibue)

Actor
 1952: Kin no tamago: Golden girl (金の卵　Ｇｏｌｄｅｎ　Ｇｉｒｌ)

References

External links
 

1906 births
1977 deaths
Japanese film directors
Japanese screenwriters
People from Kyoto